Martín del Río is a municipality located in the province of Teruel, Aragon, Spain. According to the 2010 census the municipality has a population of 469 inhabitants.

Road N-211 crosses the eastern side of Martín del Río.

See also
Cuencas Mineras
List of municipalities in Teruel

References

Municipalities in the Province of Teruel